"New Man" is a song by American CCM band All Things New. It was released on February 8, 2013 as the first single from their debut studio album, All Things New (2013).

Background 
The song was co-written by All Things New, Maks Gabriel and Hillary McBride, and produced by Casey Brown and Jonathan Smith.

Release 
"New Man" was digitally released as the lead single from All Things New on February 8, 2013.

Music video 
The band has made a music video of the song.

Weekly charts

References 

2013 singles
2013 songs